The Stelmach Ministry was the combined Cabinet (called Executive Council of Alberta), chaired by thirteenth Premier Ed Stelmach, and Ministers that governed Alberta shortly after the conclusion of the first session of the 26th Alberta Legislature from December 14, 2006, to the mid-point of the fourth session of the 27th Alberta Legislature on October 7, 2011.

The Executive Council (commonly known as the cabinet) is made up of members of the Alberta Progressive Conservative Party which held a majority of the seats in the Legislative Assembly of Alberta.  The cabinet was appointed by the Lieutenant Governor of Alberta on the advice of the premier.  Members of the council are styled "the Honourable" only for the duration of their membership, not for life.

The first Stelmach ministry was sworn in on December 15, 2006, after Stelmach took over the leadership of Alberta Conservatives following the 2006 leadership election, until February 4, 2008 when the legislature was dissolved and an election was called. The second Stelmach cabinet was sworn in on March 12, 2008, and continued until October 7, 2011, when Alison Redford succeeded Stelmach as premier.

Cabinets of Ed Stelmach

See also
Executive Council of Alberta
List of Alberta provincial ministers

References

External links 
 News Release - New cabinet team will focus on listening to Albertans and meeting their priorities, says Premier Stelmach

Politics of Alberta
Executive Council of Alberta
2006 establishments in Alberta
Cabinets established in 2006
Cabinets disestablished in 2011